Terrien marginal degeneration is a noninflammatory, unilateral or asymmetrically bilateral, slowly progressive thinning of the peripheral corneal stroma.

Cause
The cause of Terrien marginal degeneration is unknown, its prevalence is roughly equal between males and females, and it usually occurs in the second or third decade of life.

Diagnosis

Treatments 
Spectacles or RGP contact lenses can be used to manage the astigmatism. when the condition worsens, surgical correction may be required.

References

External links 

Disorders of sclera and cornea
Eye diseases